Ezechiel de Decker (c. 1603-c. 1647) was a Dutch surveyor and teacher of mathematics.

Tables of logarithms

In 1625, De Decker entered a contract with Adriaan Vlacq for the publication of 
several translations of books by John Napier, Edmund Gunter and Henry Briggs. A first book was published in 1626, with several translations
done by Vlacq. A second book was made of the logarithms of the first 10000 numbers
from Briggs' Arithmetica logarithmica published in 1624. The logarithms were shortened
to 10 places. In 1627, De Decker's "Tweede deel" was published and it contained
the logarithms of all numbers from 1 to 100000, to 10 places. Only very few copies of
this book are known and its publication was apparently stopped or delayed.
In 1628, Vlacq's Arithmetica logarithmica was published and contained exactly
the tables published in 1627.

Publications

 Ezechiel de Decker: Eerste Deel van de Nieuwe Telkonst, 1626
 Ezechiel de Decker: Nieuwe Telkonst, 1626
 Ezechiel de Decker: Tweede Deel van de Nieuwe Tel-konst, 1627 (partial facsimile published in 1964)

References

1600s births
1640s deaths
Dutch surveyors